The Dark Brotherhood and Other Pieces is a collection of stories, poems and essays by American author H. P. Lovecraft and others, edited by August Derleth. It was released in 1966 by Arkham House in an edition of 3,460 copies. The dustjacket is by Frank Utpatel.

Some controversy was raised by the publication of the Chalker bibliography (see below), as George T. Wetzel claimed with some plausibility that Chalker had pirated Wetzel's own bibliography of 1955.

Contents

The Dark Brotherhood and Other Pieces contains the following pieces:

 "Introduction", by August Derleth
 "The Dark Brotherhood" by H. P. Lovecraft and August Derleth
 "Suggestions for a Reading Guide", by H. P. Lovecraft
 "Alfredo", by H. P. Lovecraft
 "Amateur Journalism: Its Possible Needs and Betterment", by H. P. Lovecraft
 "What Belongs in Verse", by H. P. Lovecraft
 Six Poems, by H. P. Lovecraft
"Bells"
"Oceanus"
"Clouds"
"Mother Earth"
"Cindy"
"On a Battlefield in France"
 Three Stories by C. M. Eddy, Jr.
"The Loved Dead"
"Deaf, Dumb, and Blind"
"The Ghost-Eater"
 "The Lovecraft "Books": Some Addenda and Corrigenda", by William Scott Home
 "To Arkham and the Stars", by Fritz Leiber
 "Through Hyperspace With Brown Jenkin", by Fritz Leiber
 "Lovecraft and the New England Megaliths", by Andrew E. Rothovius
 "Howard Phillips Lovecraft: A Bibliography", by Jack L. Chalker
 "Walks With H. P. Lovecraft", by C. M. Eddy, Jr.
 "The Cancer of Superstition", by C. M. Eddy, Jr.
 "The Making of a Hoax", by August Derleth
 "Lovecraft's Illustrators", by John E. Vetter
 "Final Notes", by August Derleth

Sources

1966 anthologies
Short story collections by H. P. Lovecraft
American poetry collections
Essay anthologies